Nukini (Nukuini, Nuquini) is an obsolescent Panoan language of Brazil (Fleck 2013).

Notes

Panoan languages